Charles Horne may refer to:

 Charles Silvester Horne (1865–1914), British Congregationalist minister and politician
 Charles Francis Horne (1870–1942), American author

See also
 Charles Van Horne (1921–2003), politician in New Brunswick, Canada
Charles Horn (disambiguation)
Charles Horner (disambiguation)